Pyramidal or pyramid elm may refer to various cultivars of Wych elm Ulmus glabra and other elms. The following list is not complete:

 Ulmus glabra = campestris, sometimes referred to as pyramidal; its inner bark was used medicinally
 Ulmus 'Exoniensis', the Exeter Elm, when trimmed in pyramid form, the Scandinavian pyramidalm
 Ulmus glabra 'Fastigiata Variegata'
 Ulmus minor 'Atinia Pyramidalis'